University of Madrid may refer to:
 Complutense University of Madrid, a public research university founded in 1293, historically referred to as the Universidad de Madrid
 Autonomous University of Madrid, a public university established in 1968 also known as UAM
 Technical University of Madrid, founded in 1971 from the merger of several schools of engineering and architecture, originated mainly in the 18th century
 Carlos III University of Madrid, a public university founded in 1989
 European University of Madrid, a private university founded in 1995 and owned by Laureate Education, Inc.